is the 29th single by Japanese entertainer Akina Nakamori. Written by Seriko Natsuno and Tsugutoshi Gotō, the single was released on September 2, 1994, by MCA Victor.

Background 
"Yoru no Doko ka de (Night Shift)" was used as the ending theme of the NTV news program . Newscaster Yoshiko Sakurai appears on the single's jacket cover.

The B-side is "Rose Bud", which was used as the ending theme of the Fuji TV talk show .

Chart performance 
"Yoru no Doko ka de (Night Shift)" peaked at No. 14 on Oricon's weekly singles chart and sold over 118,000 copies.

Track listing 
All lyrics are written by Seriko Natsuno; all music is composed and arranged by Tsugutoshi Gotō.

Charts

References

External links 
 
 

1994 singles
1994 songs
Akina Nakamori songs
Japanese-language songs
Universal Music Japan singles
MCA Records singles